L'Assomption may refer to:
 L'Assomption, Quebec, a city
 L'Assomption Regional County Municipality in Quebec
 L'Assomption (provincial electoral district), a provincial electoral district in Quebec
 L'Assomption (electoral district), a former federal electoral district in Quebec
 Joliette—L'Assomption—Montcalm, a former federal electoral district in Quebec
 L'Assomption River, a river in Quebec
 L'Assomption station, a former railway station in Quebec

See also 
 Assomption (Montreal Metro), a station on the Montreal Metro (subway)